Rahelty, sometimes written Rahealty, is a civil parish in County Tipperary, Ireland. It is one of 21 civil parishes in the historical barony of Eliogarty.
It contains eighteen townlands:

Archerstown
Athlummon
Cassestown
Coolaculla
Corbally
Drish
Garranroe
Knockanacunna
Knockroe
Kyle
Lisduff
Loughbeg
Piercetown
Rahelty
Rathcriddoge
Rathmanna
Shanballyduff
Townagha

The lands of the civil parish are divided into two disjoint areas by a strip of Thurles civil parish which stretches eastward to meet Borrisleigh civil parish. The, larger, northern area of Rahelty contains these ten townlands:  Athlummon,   
Cassestown,
Coolaculla,  
Garranroe,
Knockanacunna,
Lisduff,
Piercetown,
Rahelty,
Rathcriddoge and
Shanballyduff.
The southern area contains the eight remaining townlands: Archerstown, Corbally, Drish, Knockroe, Kyle, Loughbeg, Rathmanna and Townagha.

References

 Rahelty